The Enchanted Maiden is a Portuguese fairy tale collected by Zófimo Consiglieri Pedroso in Portuguese Folk-Tales.

Synopsis

A man had three daughters. To announce that the first one was ready for marriage, he hung up a golden ball; every man passing by believed the family to be too rich for him, until a prince came and asked for her hand in marriage. The same thing happened to the second, but when it was the turn of the youngest, the man could not afford a golden ball. He hung up a silver one instead; and another prince passed but as it was too poor for him, another man came instead to marry her. As a result, the youngest daughter's sisters refused to associate with her. One day, as she was giving birth, fairies asked for shelter; she tried to plead that she was not well, but the fairies continued pleading, and she let them stay. When she gave birth to a daughter, the fairies blessed the baby with beauty, riches, and having flowers fall from her mouth when she spoke. This reconciled the sisters who married princes with their youngest sister.

When the enchanted maiden had grown up, a prince who was betrothed to a daughter of her aunt fell in love with her and wanted nothing to do with his betrothed. He fell ill, and his physicians ordered him to travel. The enchanted maiden climbed up a tower to watch him go, and the betrothed maiden put out her eyes with a stick. A man gave her shelter, but when the prince returned, his betrothed claimed to be the enchanted maiden, who could not go to him because she was blind. The enchanted maiden told the betrothed that she would give her flowers for her wedding in return for her eyes, so the betrothed girl sent her her eyes. She put them back and went to the wedding to ask the prince not to marry the betrothed girl. The prince asked his guests that after having lost something, bought another, and found the original, whether he should use the new or the old. They recommended the old, and so he married the enchanted maiden.

See also
Biancabella and the Snake
Brother and Sister
Bushy Bride

References

Enchanted Maiden
Female characters in fairy tales